A rotating frame of reference is a special case of a non-inertial reference frame that is rotating relative to an inertial reference frame. An everyday example of a rotating reference frame is the surface of the Earth. (This article considers only frames rotating about a fixed axis. For more general rotations, see Euler angles.)

Fictitious forces

All non-inertial reference frames exhibit fictitious forces; rotating reference frames are characterized by three:

 the centrifugal force,
 the Coriolis force,
and, for non-uniformly rotating reference frames,
 the Euler force.

Scientists in a rotating box can measure the speed and direction of their rotation by measuring these fictitious forces.  For example, Léon Foucault was able to show the Coriolis force that results from Earth's rotation using the Foucault pendulum.  If Earth were to rotate many times faster, these fictitious forces could be felt by humans, as they are when on a spinning carousel.

Relating rotating frames to stationary frames
The following is a derivation of the formulas for accelerations as well as fictitious forces in a rotating frame. It begins with the relation between a particle's coordinates in a rotating frame and its coordinates in an inertial (stationary) frame. Then, by taking time derivatives, formulas are derived that relate the velocity of the particle as seen in the two frames, and the acceleration relative to each frame. Using these accelerations, the fictitious forces are identified by comparing Newton's second law as formulated in the two different frames.

Relation between positions in the two frames 

To derive these fictitious forces, it's helpful to be able to convert between the coordinates  of the rotating reference frame and the coordinates  of an inertial reference frame with the same origin. 
and if the two reference frames coincide at time  (meaning  when  so take  or some other integer multiple of ), the transformation from rotating coordinates to inertial coordinates can be written

whereas the reverse transformation is

This result can be obtained from a rotation matrix.

Introduce the unit vectors  representing standard unit basis vectors in the rotating frame. The time-derivatives of these unit vectors are found next. Then for a counterclockwise rotation through angle :

where the  components are expressed in the stationary frame. Likewise,

Thus the time derivative of these vectors, which rotate without changing magnitude, is

where  
This result is the same as found using a vector cross product with the rotation vector  pointed along the z-axis of rotation  namely,

where  is either  or

Time derivatives in the two frames 
Introduce unit vectors , now representing standard unit basis vectors in the general rotating frame. As they rotate they will remain normalized and perpendicular to each other.

If  is a vector function that is written as

and we want to examine its first derivative then (using the product rule of differentiation):

As a shorthand the differentiation is expressed as:

This result is also known as the transport theorem in analytical dynamics and is also sometimes referred to as the basic kinematic equation.

Relation between velocities in the two frames 
A velocity of an object is the time-derivative of the object's position, so

The time derivative of a position  in a rotating reference frame has two components, one from the explicit time dependence due to motion of the particle itself, and another from the frame's own rotation.  Applying the result of the previous subsection to the displacement  the velocities in the two reference frames are related by the equation

where subscript  means the inertial frame of reference, and  means the rotating frame of reference.

Relation between accelerations in the two frames 
Acceleration is the second time derivative of position, or the first time derivative of velocity

where subscript  means the inertial frame of reference,  the rotating frame of reference, and where the expression, again,  in the bracketed expression on the left is to be interpreted as an operator working onto the bracketed expression on the right.

As , the first time derivatives of  inside either frame, when expressed with respect to the basis of e.g. the inertial frame, coincide.
Carrying out the differentiations and re-arranging some terms yields the acceleration relative to the rotating reference frame, 

where  is the apparent acceleration in the rotating reference frame, the term  represents centrifugal acceleration, and the term  is the Coriolis acceleration. The last term, is the Euler acceleration and is zero in uniformly rotating frames.

Newton's second law in the two frames 
When the expression for acceleration is multiplied by the mass of the particle, the three extra terms on the right-hand side result in fictitious forces in the rotating reference frame, that is, apparent forces that result from being in a non-inertial reference frame, rather than from any physical interaction between bodies.

Using Newton's second law of motion  we obtain:

 the Coriolis force 
 the centrifugal force 
 and the Euler force 
where  is the mass of the object being acted upon by these fictitious forces. Notice that all three forces vanish when the frame is not rotating, that is, when 

For completeness, the inertial acceleration  due to impressed external forces  can be determined from the total physical force in the inertial (non-rotating) frame (for example, force from physical interactions such as electromagnetic forces) using Newton's second law in the inertial frame:

Newton's law in the rotating frame then becomes

In other words, to handle the laws of motion in a rotating reference frame:

Centrifugal force

In classical mechanics, centrifugal force is an outward force associated with rotation. Centrifugal force is one of several so-called pseudo-forces (also known as inertial forces), so named because, unlike real forces, they do not originate in interactions with other bodies situated in the environment of the particle upon which they act. Instead, centrifugal force originates in the rotation of the frame of reference within which observations are made.

Coriolis effect

The mathematical expression for the Coriolis force appeared in an 1835 paper by a French scientist Gaspard-Gustave Coriolis in connection with hydrodynamics, and also in the tidal equations of Pierre-Simon Laplace in 1778. Early in the 20th century, the term Coriolis force began to be used in connection with meteorology.

Perhaps the most commonly encountered rotating reference frame is the Earth. Moving objects on the surface of the Earth experience a Coriolis force, and appear to veer to the right in the northern hemisphere, and to the left in the southern. Movements of air in the atmosphere and water in the ocean are notable examples of this behavior: rather than flowing directly from areas of high pressure to low pressure, as they would on a non-rotating planet, winds and currents tend to flow to the right of this direction north of the equator, and to the left of this direction south of the equator. This effect is responsible for the rotation of large cyclones (see Coriolis effects in meteorology).

Euler force

In classical mechanics, the Euler acceleration (named for Leonhard Euler), also known as azimuthal acceleration or transverse acceleration  is an acceleration that appears when a non-uniformly rotating reference frame is used for analysis of motion and there is variation in the angular velocity of the reference frame's axis. This article is restricted to a frame of reference that rotates about a fixed axis.

Use in magnetic resonance
It is convenient to consider magnetic resonance in a frame that rotates at the Larmor frequency of the spins. This is illustrated in the animation below. The rotating wave approximation may also be used.

See also
 Absolute rotation
 Centrifugal force (rotating reference frame) Centrifugal force as seen from systems rotating about a fixed axis
 Mechanics of planar particle motion Fictitious forces exhibited by a particle in planar motion as seen by the particle itself and by observers in a co-rotating frame of reference
 Coriolis force The effect of the Coriolis force on the Earth and other rotating systems
 Inertial frame of reference
 Non-inertial frame
 Fictitious force A more general treatment of the subject of this article

References

External links
 Animation clip showing scenes as viewed from both an inertial frame and a rotating frame of reference, visualizing the Coriolis and centrifugal forces.

Frames of reference
Classical mechanics
Astronomical coordinate systems
Surveying
Rotation